Charles Frederick Carlos Clarke (26 April 1853 – 29 January 1931) was an English first-class cricketer active 1873–90 who played for Surrey. He was born in Welton, Northamptonshire and died in Virginia Water.

References

1853 births
1931 deaths
English cricketers
Surrey cricketers
Marylebone Cricket Club cricketers
Gentlemen of the South cricketers
Gentlemen of Marylebone Cricket Club cricketers
Gentlemen of England cricketers
I Zingari cricketers
Berkshire cricketers